(Z)-3-hexen-1-ol acetyltransferase (CHAT, At3g03480) is an enzyme with systematic name acetyl-CoA:(3Z)-hex-3-en-1-ol acetyltransferase. This enzyme catalyses the following chemical reaction

 acetyl-CoA + (3Z)-hex-3-en-1-ol  CoA + (3Z)-hex-3-en-1-yl acetate

The enzyme is responsible for the production of (3Z)-hex-3-en-1-yl acetate.

References

External links 
 

EC 2.3.1